Tsifenokataka is a rural commune in the region of Fitovinany eastern Madagascar in the former province of Fianarantsoa. It has a population of  2,604 inhabitants.

References

Populated places in Fitovinany